Phlox amoena, commonly called hairy phlox, is a flowering plant in the phlox family.  It is native to the Southeastern United States where it is found in sandhills, dry woodlands, and open areas with native vegetation.

It is a perennial that produces purple-pink flowers in the spring. It is distinguished from the similar-looking Phlox pilosa by its more compact and non-glandular flowers.

References

amoena